Josateki Naulu (8 June 1984) is a Fijian judoka who was flag-bearer for Fiji at the 2012 Summer Olympics. In the Men's 81kg event, he lost in the second round.

He attended Lelean Memorial School and also played in the Fiji Secondary Schools' rugby union Deans Trophy competition in the year 2000.

He earned an IOC scholarship to live and train in Japan.

He competed at the 2016 Summer Olympics in the men's 81 kg event, in which he was eliminated in the second round.

References

External links
 

Fijian male judoka
1984 births
Olympic judoka of Fiji
Judoka at the 2012 Summer Olympics
Judoka at the 2016 Summer Olympics
Living people
People educated at Lelean Memorial School
Sportspeople from Suva
I-Taukei Fijian people